Evidence & Policy: A Journal of Research, Debate & Practice is a quarterly peer-reviewed academic journal covering the relationship between research evidence and public policy. It was established in 2005 and is published by Policy Press. The founding editors-in-chief were Ken Young and Annette Boaz. The current editors-in-chief are Zachary P. Neal (Michigan State University) and Caroline Oliver (University College London).

Abstracting and indexing
The journal is abstracted and indexed in Current Contents/Social and Behavioral Sciences, International Bibliography of the Social Sciences,  Scopus, and the Social Sciences Citation Index. According to the Journal Citation Reports, the journal has a 2020 impact factor of 1.836, ranking it 62nd out of 109 journals in the category "Social Science, Interdisciplinary".

Editors-in-chief
The following persons are or have been editors-in-chief:
Ken Young (2005–2008)
Annette Boaz (2005–2017)
David Gough (2008–2017)
Katherine Smith (2018–2021)
Mark Pearson (2018–2021)
Zachary P. Neal (2022–present)
Caroline Oliver (2022–present)

Special issues
In each volume year, the journal publishes a special issue organized by guest editors addressing a specific topic. Recent special issues have included:

 The many faces of disability in evidence for policy and practice. Guest edited by Carol Rivas, Ikuko Tomomatsu and David Gough (Volume 17, Number 2, May 2021)
 Opening up evidence-based policy: exploring citizen and service user expertise. Guest edited by Ellen Stewart, Jennifer Smith-Merry and Marc Geddes (Volume 16, Number 2, May 2020)
 Co-creative approaches to knowledge production and implementation. Guest edited by Allison Metz, Annette Boaz and Glenn Robert (Volume 15, Number 3, August 2019)
 Networks and network analysis in evidence, policy and practice. Guest-edited by Kathryn Oliver and Moira Faul (Volume 14, Number 3, August 2018)

Carol Weiss Prize
In 2016 the journal created the Carol Weiss Prize to recognize outstanding early career contributors to the journal. The author of the winning article receives £100 in books from Policy Press, and the winning article is made open access for three months. Past winners have included:
 In 2016: 
 In 2017: 
 In 2019: 
 In 2021 (co-winner): 
 In 2021 (co-winner):

References

External links

Publications established in 2005
Policy analysis journals
English-language journals
Quarterly journals
University of Bristol